Mfiondu Tshimanga Kabengele (born August 14, 1997) is a Canadian professional basketball player for the Boston Celtics of the National Basketball Association (NBA), on a two-way contract with the Maine Celtics of the NBA G League. He played college basketball for the Florida State Seminoles. He was drafted 27th overall in the 2019 NBA draft by the Brooklyn Nets and immediately traded to the Clippers.

College career
Kabengele came to Florida State as an unheralded recruit and redshirted his freshman season. As a redshirt freshman, he played an important role on a team that reached the Elite Eight, averaging 7.2 points and 4.6 rebounds per game. In his sophomore year, Kabengele led the team in scoring with 13.2 points per game along with 5.9 rebounds and 1.5 blocks per game despite not starting a single contest. He was named ACC Sixth Man of the Year. During the NCAA Tournament, Kabengele averaged 17.0 points, 8.0 rebounds, and 2.0 blocks per game. On April 9, 2019, he declared for the NBA draft, thus forgoing his remaining two years of collegiate eligibility.

Professional career

Los Angeles Clippers (2019–2021)
On June 20, 2019, Kabengele was selected by the Brooklyn Nets with the 27th pick of the 2019 NBA draft, and his draft right was later traded to the Los Angeles Clippers in exchange for a future first-round pick in the 2020 NBA draft and the draft rights to the 56th pick of the 2019 NBA draft, Jaylen Hands. On July 9, 2019, the Clippers announced that they had signed Kabengele. On October 24, 2019, Kabengele made his debut in NBA, coming off the bench in a 141–122 win over the Golden State Warriors with three points, a rebound and a block. On November 16, 2019, Kabengele got himself 10 points and two rebounds in a 150–101 blowout win against the Atlanta Hawks. Kabengele posted 25 points, 12 rebounds, three assists, three blocks and two steals on assignment for the G League's Agua Caliente Clippers in a 112-102 loss to the Rio Grande Valley Vipers on January 14, 2020. He recorded 38 points, 12 rebounds, and a block on January 19 in a G League win over the Stockton Kings. He worked to establish a three-point shot from the professional distance, in the G League.

On March 22, 2021, Kabengele, along with a 2022 second-round pick belonging to the Atlanta Hawks, was traded to the Sacramento Kings for the Kings' 2022 second-round pick. Three days later, he was waived.

Cleveland Cavaliers (2021)
On April 10, 2021, Kabengele signed a 10-day contract with the Cleveland Cavaliers. On April 21, he signed a second 10-day contract. On May 1, he signed a multi-year contract. On May 9, Kabengele logged a career-high 14 points on 5-of-7 shooting from the field and 1-of-2 from three, along with four rebounds and one assist across a career-high 23 minutes of play in a 124–97 loss to the Dallas Mavericks. On October 12, 2021, the Cleveland Cavaliers waived Kabengele.

Rio Grande Valley Vipers (2021–2022)
On October 17, 2021, Kabengele signed with the Houston Rockets, but was waived shortly thereafter. He subsequently joined the Rio Grande Valley Vipers of the NBA G League.

Boston Celtics (2022–present)
On July 16, 2022, Kabengele signed a two-way contract with the Boston Celtics after an impressive showing during Summer League Play.

Career statistics

NBA

|-
| style="text-align:left;"| 
| style="text-align:left;"| L.A. Clippers
| 12 || 0 || 5.3 || .438 || .450 || 1.000 || .9 || .2 || .2 || .2 || 3.5
|-
| style="text-align:left;" rowspan=2| 
| style="text-align:left;"| L.A. Clippers
| 23 || 0 || 4.1 || .281 || .222 || .833 || .6 || .2 || .1 || .1 || 1.2
|-
| style="text-align:left;"| Cleveland
| 16 || 0 || 11.6 || .421 || .281 || .786 || 2.9 || .8 || .4 || .6 || 4.3
|- class="sortbottom"
| style="text-align:center;" colspan="2"| Career
| 51 || 0 || 6.7 || .388 || .314 || .840 || 1.4 || .4 || .2 || .3 || 2.7

College

|-
| style="text-align:left;"| 2017–18
| style="text-align:left;"| Florida State
| 34 || 0 || 14.8 || .491 || .385 || .657 || 4.6 || .3 || .4 || .9 || 7.2
|-
| style="text-align:left;"| 2018–19
| style="text-align:left;"| Florida State
| 37 || 0 || 21.6 || .502 || .369 || .761 || 5.9 || .3 || .6 || 1.5 || 13.2
|- class="sortbottom"
| style="text-align:center;" colspan="2"| Career
| 71 || 0 || 18.3 || .498 || .374 || .724 || 5.3 || .3 || .5 || 1.2 || 10.3

Personal life
Kabengele's parents Tshilongo and Tshimanga Kabengele are originally from the Democratic Republic of the Congo but moved to Canada for educational reasons. His maternal uncle is Dikembe Mutombo, a Basketball Hall of Fame inductee who played in the National Basketball Association (NBA) for 18 years. Kabengele was an international affairs major at Florida State University, and is fluent in French.

References

External links
Florida State Seminoles bio
Florida State's Mfiondu Kabengele ready to excel in reserve role

1997 births
Living people
Agua Caliente Clippers players
Basketball people from Ontario
Black Canadian basketball players
Brooklyn Nets draft picks
Canadian expatriate basketball people in the United States
Canadian men's basketball players
Canadian people of Democratic Republic of the Congo descent
Centers (basketball)
Cleveland Cavaliers players
Florida State Seminoles men's basketball players
Los Angeles Clippers players
Maine Celtics players
National Basketball Association players from Canada
Power forwards (basketball)
Rio Grande Valley Vipers players
Sportspeople from Burlington, Ontario